Hoterodes violescens is a moth in the family Crambidae. It was described by Paul Dognin in 1903. It is found in Bolivia and Peru.

References

Moths described in 1903
Spilomelinae